Gab or GAB may refer to:

 Gáb, a cuneiform sign
 Gab (social network), an American social networking platform
 "Gab" (song), an Occitan boasting song of the Middle Ages
 Gab, Iran, a village in Hormozgan Province
 Games and Amusements Board, a Philippine sports and gambling regulatory government agency
 Georgia Academy for the Blind
 German American Bund, a German-American pro-Nazi organization (1936–1941)
 Government Accountability Board, a defunct (since 2016) Wisconsin political regulatory institution
 The Great American Bash, a professional wrestling event
 Great Artesian Basin, in Australia
 Great Australian Bight, an open bay
 Greater Atlantic Bank, a defunct American community bank

See also
 Gabb (disambiguation)
 Gabs (disambiguation)